Hard to Be a Rock'n Roller is the first album by the Norwegian rock band Wig Wam. It was released on January 10, 2005. 

The album was originally released on March 8, 2004, under the title 667.. The Neighbour of the Beast. The reissue features the same tracks with the addition of an instrumental track titled "The Drop" and radio edits of "Hard to Be a Rock'n Roller" and "In My Dreams".

The album increased the band's reputation in Norway and the rest of Scandinavia and was Wig Wam's final album before their winning Eurovision Song Contest appearance in 2005; which led to the reissue of the album, as it featured the song "In My Dreams" that the band performed at Eurovision. The album was also issued in two others versions, Hard to Be a Rock'n Roller.. In Kiev! (Europe) and Hard to Be a Rock'n Roller.. In Tokyo! (Japan).

Track listing

Release history
Hard to Be a Rock'n Roller
The first release of the album, only released in Scandinavia.

Hard to Be a Rock'n Roller.. in Kiev!
The second reissue of the album, featuring a slightly different track listing and almost the same artwork as the Scandinavian version, with  only "In Kiev!" being added to the title. The album was released in main Europe.

Hard to Be a Rock'n Roller..
The first reissue of the album, featuring a different artwork and a slightly different track listing. It was also only released in Scandinavia.

Hard to Be a Rock'n Roller.. in Tokyo!
The third and final reissue of the album, featuring the same track listing as the European version, including some additional bonus tracks. This version also features almost the same artwork as the European version with a red ring being added to the background (making it look like the Japanese national flag). The album was released in Japan and additional countries in Asia.

References

Wig Wam albums
2005 albums